Randal D. Pinkett (born 1971) is an American business consultant who in 2005 was the winner of season four of the reality television show The Apprentice. Pinkett is the first African American to win the US version of The Apprentice.

With an educational background in engineering and business, Pinkett is both a Rhodes Scholar and a Walter Byers Scholar, and holds five academic degrees. Before entering the reality show, Pinkett had already established a career in business and had become co-founder of business consulting firm BCT Partners in 2001. As winner of The Apprentice Season 4 in December 2005, Pinkett undertook a yearlong apprenticeship with Trump Entertainment Resorts in Atlantic City, New Jersey.

After The Apprentice, Pinkett has continued as chairman and CEO of BCT Partners, while also acting as a public speaker and appearing on later editions of the show, and on CEO Exchange; he has also entered politics.

Early life
Raised in East Windsor, New Jersey, Pinkett graduated from Hightstown High School in neighboring Hightstown. He began attending Rutgers University in 1989 and graduated summa cum laude in 1994, with a BS in electrical engineering. Pinkett is the first African American from Rutgers to become a Rhodes Scholar. He went on to attend the University of Oxford from 1994 to 1996 as a member of Keble College, where he earned an MSc in computer science. He then attended Massachusetts Institute of Technology from 1996 to 1998, where he graduated with a second MS, this time in electrical engineering, and an M.B.A. from the MIT Sloan School of Management through the Leaders for Global Operations program. He continued his education at MIT, where he earned a PhD in media arts and sciences from the MIT Media Laboratory in 2001. Pinkett's PhD thesis is titled "Creating Community Connections: Sociocultural Constructionism and an Asset-Based Approach to Community Technology and Community Building."

The Apprentice
In 2005, 34-year-old Pinkett, along with 17 other contestants, entered the Season 4 of The Apprentice. His wife downloaded the application form, planting the idea of auditioning for the show in his mind. The Apprentice is a reality television series which premiered in January 2004, in which American entrepreneur Donald Trump uses a series of tasks and a process of elimination to ultimately select one candidate for a yearlong apprenticeship with one of his companies. The fourth season began filming in May 2005 and began airing September 2005; the two-episode finale aired on December 8 and 15, 2005. Pinkett reached the finale with one other contestant, 23-year-old financial journalist Rebecca Jarvis. Pinkett was to organise a celebrity ballgame for Autism Speaks, while Jarvis' task was to stage a comedy night in aid of the Elizabeth Glaser Pediatric AIDS Foundation. Despite the game's being rained out, Pinkett raised nearly $11,000.

In the final judgement, Trump criticized Pinkett for not spotlighting the celebrities in attendance at his event, and by Trump's advisor Carolyn Kepcher for not having a backup plan when the weather turned. Despite this, Trump chose Pinkett as the winner, describing him as an "amazing leader" and saying, "Rarely have I seen a leader as good as you, and you lead through niceness". Moments after the announcement, Trump asked Pinkett his opinion as to whether Trump should take the unprecedented step and hire the "outstanding" Jarvis, too. In his reply, Pinkett asserted that there could only be one winner of the contest, a view which Trump chose to agree with. This stance attracted much comment after the show, and Pinkett later defended his rationale, but made it clear he had no objection to Jarvis' being hired by the Trump organization at a later date. The reactions had taken Pinkett by surprise, but he later stated he remained on good terms with Jarvis. Speaking years later about the incident, Pinkett told a reporter for The New Yorker: "The only conclusion I can draw is that he [Trump] didn’t want to see a black man be the sole winner of his show."

Pinkett started his apprenticeship on February 6, 2006. His task was to oversee the $110m renovation of the Trump Taj Mahal, the Trump Plaza Hotel and Casino, and the Trump Marina, three casino resorts operated by Trump Entertainment Resorts in Atlantic City, New Jersey.

Politics
In July 2006, Pinkett served as a co-chairman of the transition team of newly elected Newark, New Jersey Mayor Cory Booker.

On July 14, 2009, it was reported by a number of sources that Pinkett had emerged as the frontrunner to be New Jersey Governor Jon Corzine's selection for lieutenant governor in the 2009 Gubernatorial election. Some reports indicated an announcement would be made on Thursday, July 16. However, no announcement took place, and criticism appeared in the media and from some political leaders regarding Corzine's potential selection of a running mate with no experience in public office. Later in the week, news reports indicated Pinkett's selection was less likely and that other front runners had emerged, due at least in part to public criticism of the idea of a political newcomer as the Governor's running mate.  On July 24, Corzine selected State Senator Loretta Weinberg. In 2009, Pinkett was the chair of the State Democratic Committee's Yes We Can 2.0; its name based on Barack Obama's campaign slogan, it sought to turn out newly registered voters from the 2008 presidential election for the gubernatorial election.

Personal life
According to his website, Pinkett was an academic All-American at Rutgers. He was named a member of the 1993 USA TODAY All-USA Academic Team and Pinkett was a member of the Cap and Skull organization. He served as President of MEET, the Rutgers Chapter of the National Society of Black Engineers, and was the captain of the Rutgers varsity men's track and field team, competing both as a high jumper and long jumper. In 1993, Pinkett was named Arthur Ashe Jr. Sports Scholar by Diverse: Issues in Higher Education. Additionally, he was the 1994 male Walter Byers Scholarship winner as the NCAA's top scholar athlete. Pinkett is a member of Alpha Phi Alpha fraternity.

In 2006, Pinkett was given the Paul Robeson Leadership Award by Concerned Black Men of Massachusetts.

In August 2007, Pinkett's wife, Zahara, gave birth to a daughter in New Brunswick, New Jersey. The Pinkett family resides in Somerset, New Jersey.

Bibliography

 .

References

External links

bctpartners.com BCT Partners.

1971 births
African-American writers
African-American businesspeople
American business writers
Alumni of Keble College, Oxford
American Rhodes Scholars
Digital divide activists
Hightstown High School alumni
Living people
MIT School of Engineering alumni
MIT Sloan School of Management alumni
People from Franklin Township, Somerset County, New Jersey
People from East Windsor, New Jersey
Businesspeople from Philadelphia
Rutgers University alumni
Businesspeople from New Jersey
New Jersey Democrats
The Trump Organization employees
21st-century American businesspeople
21st-century American non-fiction writers
MIT Media Lab people
The Apprentice (franchise) winners
Participants in American reality television series